Tegula brunnea, common name the brown turban snail, is a species of medium-sized sea snail, a marine gastropod mollusk in the family Tegulidae, .

This is an Eastern Pacific Ocean species which was previously known as Chlorostoma brunnea.

Description
The size of the shell varies between 19 mm and 45 mm. The solid, imperforate shell has a conical shape. It is russet-yellow, brown, orange-colored or deep crimson. The spire is conic. The sutures are deeply impressed. The about seven whorls are convex, smooth, and obliquely lightly striate. The body whorl sometimes is obsoletely undulated or plicate below the suture. The base of the shell is depressed and deeply concave in the center. The aperture is very oblique. The columella has one or two teeth near the base. The umbilical callus is white. The place of the umbilicus is deeply excavated. The relative altitude and the size are extremely variable.

Distribution
This species occurs in the Pacific Ocean off Oregon to Santa Barbara Islands, California, USA

References

 Turgeon, D.D., et al. 1998. Common and scientific names of aquatic invertebrates of the United States and Canada. American Fisheries Society Special Publication 26 page(s): 61

External links
 To World Register of Marine Species
 

brunnea
Gastropods described in 1848